McHone is a surname. Notable people with the surname include:

 Carson McHone, American singer-songwriter and musician
 Morris McHone (born 1943), American basketball player and coach
 Steven Van McHone (1970–2005), American murderer

See also
 29146 McHone, minor planet
 McCone